Beiliu is a county-level city in the southeast of Guangxi, China. It is under the administration of Yulin city. As of 2016, it had a population of 1.5 million.

Economy
Guangxi Sanhuan, a large ceramics manufacturer, is headquartered in the city.

Transport
Luoyang–Zhanjiang Railway

Climate

References

 
County-level divisions of Guangxi
Cities in Guangxi
Yulin, Guangxi